Yes Theory is an American digital media brand built around a YouTube channel founded by Thomas Brag, Ammar Kandil, Matt Dajer, and Derin Emre. Yes Theory first gained national media attention in November 2015 with their message of inclusivity in the wake of terror attacks in Beirut and Paris. They have been featured in a range of national and international media.

Their content has been praised as experiencing foreign cultures in "a fresh and authentic way" and "consistently radiating positivity and promote living life with an open mind, exactly what YouTube and the world needs." The Yes Theory brand revolves around the group's mantra of "Seek Discomfort", a phrase also featured in the group's clothing brand, and through their second channel with 764,000 subscribers.

Background
Thomas Brag was born on 9 July 1993 in Paris, France, to Swedish parents. He received his BA degree from McGill University, where he majored in entrepreneurship. He also spent a semester at Draper University and later interviewed its founder, the billionaire venture capital investor Tim Draper. Before YouTube, Brag would make short skits with his second cousin, Warrick Rhode, when they got to see each other. This gave him the skills necessary to make and edit YouTube videos.
 
Matt Dajer was born on 28 March 1992 in New York, and grew up in Paris and Greenwich, Connecticut. He also has connections to Puerto Rico on his father's side. Dajer obtained his Bachelor of Arts degree in History from McGill University in 2014. Dajer announced in a YouTube video on February 25, 2021, that he no longer plans to appear in the group's episodes but continues to work on the brand. He is also currently writing the Yes Theory book.
 
Ammar Kandil was born on 28 April 1994 in Sadat City, Egypt and spent his early life there. He enrolled in the African Leadership Academy in South Africa. In 2011, during the Egyptian revolution, he studied at Quest University on a scholarship. In 2021, he gained Saint Kitts and Nevis citizenship, making him a dual citizen. A Saint Kitts and Nevis passport allows him to travel to over 150 countries and avoid Egypt’s compulsory military draft for men aged 18 to 30.

Derin Emre was born in Turkey and co-founded Yes Theory, initially taking the role of cameraman. He left Yes Theory in 2017 because of a passport issue but occasionally visits the team and has been featured in videos since.

The Yes Theory team has expanded since its inception, introducing a team of editors: Tristan Kevitch, Thomas Dajer (Matt's brother), Bryce Pery, and Cam Peddle. The brand additionally employs a team to manage their Seek Discomfort clothing and merchandise brand.

History
The group met in Montreal, Quebec, and started to work together on their first video series in the summer of 2015. Yes Theory began as a series of challenges organized by Dajer and Brag (with help from Kandil and Emre), filmed in Montreal, in the summer of 2015, a project initiated by Brag under the name "Project 30". At the time, they were all sleeping on a friend's sofa in Montreal. Thomas and Matt had briefly met before in McGill University. They came into contact with Ammar at a party after he told Thomas his plans of climbing the Pyramids of Giza. Derin was the last to join the group that summer. Each challenge was designed to push the group outside of their comfort zone. By the end of the month, the group only had around 2,000 subscribers. Their name was then changed to 'Generation Y Not'.

Near the end of 2015, Yes Theory received an offer to relocate to Venice, California, and be paid to make videos by Snapchat subsidiary Vertical Networks. As part of one of their first stunts, they successfully approached the Prime Minister of Canada, Justin Trudeau, for a Christmas card, which they sold for charity with proceeds going to Syrian refugees. Trudeau commented at the time "great stuff around diversity". After their success and viral hit, Yes Theory was awarded a budget to make their first 30 videos. In January 2016, the group travelled to the Caribbean to continue their media endeavors.

In May 2016, the group moved to Venice, California, after being signed to Vertical Networks, to a house they often referred to as the '506' and featured heavily in their videos, and they changed their name to 'Yes Theory'. Since then, that house has been demolished, and the group was forced to relocate. The current 'Yes House' is located nearby in Venice.

YouTube and Film
After moving to Venice, California they went on a series of international trips. They gained media attention in London by welcoming British people at Heathrow Airport with hugs, described in the press as "truly heartwarming".

Other activities they have embarked on include taking an Irish girl on a last minute trip to Japan, who said of the experience "they try to connect to people around the world and let them know that they're not alone and bring people together".

In September 2018, their challenge to get American actor and media personality Will Smith to bungee jump from a helicopter over the Grand Canyon was taken up by Smith.

In October 2018, they orchestrated a viral stunt of what appeared to be Justin Bieber eating a burrito sideways. In reality, the group flew a Justin Bieber look-alike named Brad Sousa to Los Angeles and fabricated the entire scene as a prank. It was Yes Theory's friend Conor who posted the video to the subreddit .

In February 2019, they released Frozen Alive, a feature-length documentary about endurance athlete Wim Hof. This was their first long-form documentary.

In September 2019, they released The Lost Pyramid, a feature-length documentary about their adventure through the Guatemalan jungle to visit El Mirador and climb the previously unrecorded La Danta pyramid.

In September 2020, Ammar released his autobiographical documentary Free Child in partnership with Google.

In December 2022, they released Project Iceman, a feature-length documentary about Anders Hofman attempting to complete the first Ironman Triathalon in Antarctica, with the aim of proving that "limitations are only perceptions", Hofman states. This is the first of their films to be released in theaters, with nine red carpet premiers spanning eight cities, before being released to the public in the United States on December 4th, 2022. After turning down a $1.25 million investment offer in order to maintain creative direction over the film, they chose to fund the project solely from NFTs.

Awards and nominations

References

External links

Canadian bloggers
Canadian YouTubers
Travel web series
Vlogs-related YouTube channels
YouTube channels launched in 2014
YouTube travel vloggers
YouTube vloggers